S Vijayadharani is an Indian politician and incumbent member of the Tamil Nadu Legislative Assembly from the Vilavancode constituency. She represents the Indian National Congress party. She is great-granddaughter of eminent Tamil poet and social reformer, late Kavimani Desigavinayagam Pillai.

Personal life
S. Vijayadharani has a son and a daughter. Her daughter, Dr. Abrami Kennedy studied medicine and works as an MD at a private medical college in Chennai. She married Dr. Deepak Rajadurai in February 2019.

Political career 
Vijayadharani is a former President of Tamil Nadu Mahila Congress.
During 2016 she was appointed General Secretary of All India Mahila Congress, Incharge of Karnataka. She was elected for the second time in 2016 to the Tamilnadu Legislative Assembly with a huge margin rendering the ruling AIADMK under the leadership of Selvi. Jayalalitha loose deposit only in her constituency out 234 and served as the Chief Whip of the Party in the Assembly and Member of the Privilege Committee for 10 years. And again she got elected for the third time in 2021 consecutively from the same constituency in Kanyakumari district with the huge marging and continuing to be the chief Whip of the party in the Tamil Nadu Legislative Assembly.  The first and foremost member in Assembly responsible for the introduction of English Medium of Education in Government Schools in Tamilnadu and the first member to move a Private Member Bill for Prohibition in the State and for rehabilitation of people affected by alcohol drinking. It was after her demand the State Assembly enacted the 50% reservation for women in local body elections. She is the voice of the poor and needy in the Assembly. She is an orator in Tamil and English. She is a practicing Lawyer in Supreme Court and High Courts.

Elections

Tamil Nadu Legislative Assembly Elections

References

External links 
Elected representatives of Kanniyakumari district
15th Assembly members of Tamil Nadu government

People from Kanyakumari district
Indian National Congress politicians from Tamil Nadu
Living people
21st-century Indian women politicians
21st-century Indian politicians
Tamil Nadu MLAs 2011–2016
Tamil Nadu MLAs 2016–2021
1969 births
Tamil Nadu MLAs 2021–2026
Women members of the Tamil Nadu Legislative Assembly